Shathru may refer to:
 Shathru (1985 film), an Indian Malayalam film
 Shathru (2013 film), an Indian Kannada-language film
 Sathru (2019 film), an Indian Tamil-language action thriller film